USS Outpost (AGR/YAGR-10) was a , converted from a Liberty Ship, acquired by the US Navy in 1956. She was reconfigured as a radar picket ship and assigned to radar picket duty in the North Atlantic Ocean as part of the Distant Early Warning Line.

Construction
Outpost (YAGR–10) was laid down on 14 April  1945, under a Maritime Commission (MARCOM) contract, MC hull 3140, as the Liberty Ship Francis J. O'Gara, by J.A. Jones Construction, Panama City, Florida. She was launched 8 June 1945, and delivered 30 June 1945, to the Calmer Steamship Corp.

Service history

Merchant service
The Calmer Steamship Corp. operated Francis J. O'Gara for MARCOM from 30 June 1945 until 4 June 1946. Francis J. O'Garas cruises during this period included one to the US West Coast of the United States and one to various European ports.
 
On 4 June 1946 Francis J. O'Gara was laid up in the Hudson River Reserve Fleet, Jones Point, New York, of MARCOM. From 28 January 1947 until 14 January 1948, Francis J. O'Gara was operated by the Waterman Steamship Company and then the South Atlantic Steamship Company. During this period she made cruises to Europe, the Near East, and the Orient. On 20 January 1948, Francis J. O'Gara was laid up in MARCOM's Mobile, Alabama, reserve fleet.

US Navy service
On 22 May 1956, the US Navy acquired Francis J. O'Gara to be converted into an Ocean Station Radar Ship. 
 
Francis J. O'Gara was towed from Mobile, to the Philadelphia Naval Shipyard, Philadelphia, Pennsylvania, where conversion was begun to equip her with the electronic detection equipment and communication gear necessary for her role with the Continental Air Defense Command. She was assigned the Navy hull number YAGR–10 and commissioned Outpost, 6 February 1957.

After shakedown training out of Guantanamo Bay, Cuba, Outpost reported to her homeport, Davisville, Rhode Island, 3 June 1957. On 28 June, the ship steamed seaward on her first patrol and on 30 June, relieved  on picket station. The ship returned to Davisville, 19 July, but by 24 July, was underway for another patrol setting the pattern of patrols interrupted by short periods in port.
 
Outpost made a total of six patrols in 1957. These patrols continued into 1958. Outposts designation was changed to AGR–10 28 September 1958.
 
During the first half of 1961, Outpost steamed on station. But in August she steamed south to Florida and the Bahamas. From October 1961 to January 1962, she underwent overhaul at Boston, Massachusetts.

Outpost continued her Atlantic patrols in 1962, buttoning up for wartime steaming during the Cuban Missile Crisis. The onset of 1963 found Outpost steaming on station as before. In late July the ship visited Halifax, Nova Scotia.
 
From August through the end of 1963, Outpost maintained a record of no misses in reporting air contacts. She visited Halifax, again in November before putting into her homeport for the holidays. Early in 1964, she resumed her patrols and continued this pattern of operation until decommissioning 1 July 1965.

Decommissioning
She was returned to the US Maritime Administration (MARAD) 4 February 1966, and entered the Hudson River Reserve Fleet, Jones Point, New York. She was sold 17 February 1971, for scrapping in Spain.

Military awards and honors 

Outposts personnel qualified for the following medals:
 Navy Expeditionary Medal (5-Cuba)
 National Defense Service Medal
 Armed Forces Expeditionary Medal (1-Cuba)

See also 
 United States Navy
 Radar picket

References

Bibliography

External links 
 

 

Liberty ships
Ships built in Panama City, Florida
1945 ships
World War II merchant ships of the United States
Guardian-class radar picket ships
Cold War auxiliary ships of the United States
Hudson River Reserve Fleet
Mobile Reserve Fleet